Kennedy Catholic High School previously known as John F. Kennedy Catholic High School is a private, day and boarding, college-prep, Catholic high school in Burien, Washington, located in the Roman Catholic Archdiocese of Seattle.

Profile
Kennedy Catholic was established in 1966 and is one of three Diocesan-operated high schools in the Roman Catholic Archdiocese of Seattle. Kennedy Catholic was originally known as John F. Kennedy Memorial High School, but changed its name with the beginning of the 2009/2010 academic year in order to reflect its Catholic roots.

Academics

The Program

When in school, students have the opportunity to earn up to 65 college credits, and are also able to be a part of the Honors Program which includes studies in religion, the arts, English, world languages, math, social studies and science. All these programs are coordinated through the Aquinas Honors Department at Kennedy Catholic.
 Kennedy Catholic provides college credit classes through four sources: the Seattle University's Matteo Ricci College, the University of Washington, Seattle University, and the Advanced Placement Program.

Saint Teresa of Calcutta Program

Saint Teresa of Calcutta students take mainstream classes as needed.
 Teachers certified in special education
 Low student/teacher ratio
 Speech therapy
 Diagnostic/academic testing
 Direct instruction
 Social/study skills
 Modified classes in algebra, basic math, biology, earth science, English, geometry, life skills, practical law, Spanish, study skills, U.S. history and world history
 After-school tutoring
 Student tracking
 SAT modified testing

International program
Provides an academic year for foreign students who wish to study in the United States. All international students attending Kennedy High School must reside in the dormitory or with a guardian or host family. No student, regardless of age, may reside alone.

Currently there are 85 students from 11 different countries attending Kennedy.

Ministries
KOOCS (Kids Offering Others Care and Support) – Cook breakfast and visit with the homeless two Saturdays per month.
St. Vincent de Paul Society – Coordinates the JFK Advent Food Drive and Lenten Rice Bowl collection, sponsors projects for the needy with other Catholic high schools, and supports the adopted Mission Church of La Guardia, Bolivia.
Human Relations Coordinators – Representatives from each class plan assemblies and programs to further understanding among the various cultures present at JFK. Senior leaders work with the Campus Ministry Office in conflict resolution when necessary.
Relay For Life – Established in the Fall of 2004, the Relay For Life team at Kennedy engages in the American Cancer Society's Relay For Life in the spring of each school year. Typically participating at the Green Lake Relay For Life in Seattle, the team raises money for cancer research throughout the year, selling shirts, baked goods, and car washes. They then present the money to the society at the Relay, an overnight event that occurs annually. The team is typically led by upperclassmen and involves 20–40 members each year.

Athletics
Kennedy Catholic is part of the Cascade Division of the North Puget Sound League within the WIAA's District 3 (West Central)  and has won 14 State Titles and over 145 League Titles. The Kennedy Lancers has produced some NCAA Division I Prospects in the last few years including Michelle French, Nate Williams, Everrette Thompson, Paul Arnold and Cole Madison.

Controversies 
On February 13, 2020, two teachers were allegedly forced to resign after becoming engaged to same-sex partners, allegedly contradicting covenant agreements between the individuals and the school. While the religiously-affiliated school is exempt from Washington state workplace discrimination laws that prohibit discrimination based on sexual orientation, students and community members argued that firing LGBT teachers contradicts the teachings of the Catholic Church. In response, students, parents, alumni, and members of the larger Catholic community have protested in support of the two teachers.

Notable alumni
 Floyd Bannister (1973) – Major League Baseball player
 Lizanne Falsetto (1981) – business entrepreneur, wellness expert, model, and public speaker
 Mike Utley (1984) – former National Football League player
 Jim Caviezel (1987) – film actor
 J. Michael Diaz (1988) – US Assistant Attorney
 Michelle French (1995) – Olympic silver medalist in soccer (U.S. Team, year 2000)
 Mateo Messina – film and television score composer
 Paul Arnold (1999) – former National Football League player
 Joey Thomas (1999) – former National Football League player
 Cris Lewis (2006) - former National Women's Soccer League player for Portland Thorns FC, assistant women's soccer coach at the University of Oregon
 Everette Thompson (2008) – former National Football League player, played for the Arizona Cardinals
 Cole Madison (2013) – former National Football League player, played for the Green Bay Packers
 Sam Huard (2021) – former five star quarterback at the University of Washington and Cal Poly.

See also
 List of memorials to John F. Kennedy

Notes and references

External links

High schools in King County, Washington
Catholic secondary schools in Washington (state)
Educational institutions established in 1966
Schools accredited by the Northwest Accreditation Commission
High schools within the Archdiocese of Seattle
Burien, Washington
1966 establishments in Washington (state)
Monuments and memorials to John F. Kennedy in the United States